Holmqvist is a Swedish surname which may refer to:

Sports
 Andreas Holmqvist (born 1981), Swedish ice hockey defenseman
 Birger Ivar Holmqvist (1900–1989), former Swedish ice hockey player who competed at the 1928 Winter Olympics
 Johan Holmqvist (born 1978), Swedish ice hockey goaltender
 Leif Holmqvist (born 1942), former Swedish ice hockey goaltender
 Michael Holmqvist (born 1979), Swedish ice hockey forward
 Hasse Holmqvist (born 1945), Swedish motorcycle speedway rider

Arts and literature
 Ninni Holmqvist (born 1958), Swedish author and translator
 Stig Holmqvist (born 1942), Swedish author and photographer

Other fields
 Nils-Göran Holmqvist (born 1943), Swedish politician
 Wilhelm Holmqvist (1905-1989), Swedish archaeologist

Surnames
Swedish-language surnames